The Western Green Energy Hub is a proposed renewable energy hub for the southern coast of Western Australia, Australia consisting of 50GW of wind and solar capacity. It will be estimated to cost $100 billion AUD in construction and be one of the largest energy infrastructure projects in the world.

Design 
It is proposed to be built on a site area of 15,000 km2 in Dundas Shire, South-East Western Australia, on traditional Mirning land on the Great Australian Bight near Esperance, extending towards the City of Kalgoorlie-Boulder, taking advantage of the area's immense wind and solar energy potential with optimal diurnal profile and an estimated 70% delivered capacity factor.

The Western Green Energy Hub will produce 3.5 million tonnes of green hydrogen, or 20 million tonnes of green ammonia per year for domestic consumption and export, power equivalent to Australia's entire current energy capacity.

Development 
Funding will be headlined by an international consortium of InterContinenal Energy, CWP Global and Mirning Green Energy Limited.

The project will also be one of the first to define a new model for natural resource and energy companies to partner with First Nations Land Owners, with Mirning Green Energy Limited being a wholly owned subsidiary of the Mirning Traditional Lands Aboriginal Corporation.

A final investment date of 2028 is proposed.

References

Renewable energy in Australia
Solar energy in Australia
Wind power in Australia
Buildings and structures in Western Australia
Proposed power stations in Australia